Winston Duke (born 15 November 1986) is a Tobagonian actor. He made his feature film debut in the role of M'Baku in Black Panther (2018) and is best known for portraying the character in four films in the Marvel Cinematic Universe.

Duke was born in the village of Argyle, Tobago. With his sister and mother, Duke moved to Brooklyn at age nine. After graduating from the Yale School of Drama with a Master of Fine Arts in acting in 2013, Duke had small roles in theatre productions and television shows such as Person of Interest and Modern Family. He portrayed M'Baku in four Marvel Studios films and also starred in Jordan Peele's horror film Us (2019). Duke's latest role was M'Baku in Black Panther: Wakanda Forever (2022).

Early life and education
Winston Duke was born in the village of Argyle, Tobago in the country of Trinidad and Tobago on 15 November 1986. He was raised by single mother Cora Pantin, a Tobagonian government worker and restaurant owner. As a child, Duke showed the restaurant's customers to their tables and learned how to "charm" strangers at an early age. When he was nine, his mother sold the restaurant and their possessions. Duke, Pantin and his older sister, Cindy, then moved to a studio apartment in Brooklyn so that Cindy could attend medical school.<ref name=":1">{{Cite web |last=Desta |first=Yohana |date=February 16, 2018 |title=Black Panther'''s Winston Duke Is the Star You Should Be Watching |url=https://www.vanityfair.com/hollywood/2018/02/winston-duke-black-panther-mbaku-interview |access-date=November 26, 2022 |website=Vanity Fair}}</ref>

Duke attended a public primary school in Crown Heights, and often frequented the local library and comic book store after school. He graduated from Brighton High School in Rochester, New York in 2004. He attended the University at Buffalo, receiving a Bachelor of Arts in theatre. He then moved on to Yale School of Drama where he received a Master of Fine Arts in acting and graduated in 2013.

Career

 2014–2016: Theatre and television roles 
Duke started acting in theatre productions for Portland Stage Company and Yale Repertory Theatre before being cast in Person of Interest. While at Yale, he befriended fellow actor Lupita Nyong'o, with whom he later starred in Black Panther and Us. In 2012 Duke returned to his native Trinidad and Tobago to appear in the theatre production of An Echo in the Bone starring alongside actress Taromi Lourdes Joseph and directed by fellow Yale alumna Timmia Hearn Feldman.

He was cast in small roles in television series, such as a football star who commits a hate crime in Law & Order: Special Victims Unit, a gang leader in Person of Interest and a football player in Modern Family. Duke was aware of how his casting may have been influenced racially and by his height of 6 ft 5 in (1.95 m). In September 2016, Duke was cast in the role of M'Baku for the upcoming film Black Panther after Marvel tested several actors for the role, including Yahya Abdul-Mateen II.

 2018–2022: Marvel Cinematic Universe and film roles 
Duke has supporting roles in Marvel Cinematic Universe's Black Panther (2018) and Avengers: Infinity War (2018) and a brief role in Avengers: Endgame (2019) as M'Baku. Wesley Morris of The New York Times named his performance in Black Panther as one of the best in 2018, describing him as "funny, shameless [and] imposing".

In 2019, Duke starred in the blockbuster horror film Us, directed by Jordan Peele. In October 2019, Duke signed on to headline in the upcoming Apple TV+ drama series Swagger, but was replaced by O'Shea Jackson Jr. due to an injury suffered on-set in February 2020. In September, Duke was named Actor of the Year by GQ Australia. He starred in Nine Days (2020), directed by Edson Oda, as a manager who interviews unborn souls and selects them to live on Earth. In March 2020, he starred alongside Mark Wahlberg in the Netflix thriller Spenser Confidential.

On October 24, 2021, Duke received the Maverick Award at the Newport Beach Film Festival. It was reported in July 2021 that Duke would be playing Bruce Wayne/Batman in the Spotify podcast audio drama Batman Unburied, which was released in 2022. Although Duke worried that backlash from fans about a Black actor playing Wayne would surface, his role was instead met with support and intrigue. Duke reprised his role as M'Baku in Black Panther: Wakanda Forever (2022). He appeared in the latest Savage X Fenty fashion show.

 Future projects 
In 2022, Duke was cast in the upcoming 2024 film The Fall Guy.

Personal life
In October 2022, Duke's mother, with whom he was close, died at age 66. Duke mentioned about struggling with grief during the Wakanda Forever press tour. He does not have a relationship with his father. Esquire'' described Duke as an "art fanatic". He is 6 ft 5 in (1.95 m) tall.

As his mother had eleven siblings, Duke has a large extended family. His cousin is the Tobagonian politician and Progressive Democratic Patriots leader Watson Duke.

Filmography

Film

Television

Audio

References

External links
 
 

21st-century Trinidad and Tobago male actors
1986 births
American male film actors
American male television actors
Trinidad and Tobago emigrants to the United States
Living people
Male actors from Rochester, New York
Trinidad and Tobago male film actors
Trinidad and Tobago male television actors
University at Buffalo alumni
Yale School of Drama alumni
Outstanding Performance by a Cast in a Motion Picture Screen Actors Guild Award winners
21st-century Trinidad and Tobago actors